Jorge Luis "Peco" González Rivera (born 20 December 1952) is a former Puerto Rican Olympic runner. He won many races and competed in many international events, such as the Pan American Games and the Olympic Games. In 1982, he set the all-time record for the Ponce Marathon which as of 2019 has not yet been broken.

Biography
González was very famous in Puerto Rico, where people know him as Peco (after Pecos Bill, the fastest cowboy to ever live). Puerto Ricans had high hopes on him, specially at the 1984 Olympics in Los Angeles, California, but he didn't win any Olympic medals.

The height of his fame was during the 1980s, when he would do national tours across Puerto Rico, to sign autographs at department stores and be featured on television commercials.

González was born in Utuado, Puerto Rico, where he still lives. There is a venue called Jorge "Peco" González Coliseum in Utuado, named after him.

González first marriage to Aida Luz Reyes resulted in his one and only daughter, Katherine Gónzalez, who currently lives in the United States.

Athletics career
At the 1983 Pan American Games in Caracas, Venezuela, he won the first Pan American athletics gold medal for Puerto Rico.

Achievements

See also
List of Puerto Ricans

References

External links
 1983 Year Rankings
 
 
 

1952 births
Living people
People from Utuado, Puerto Rico
Puerto Rican male marathon runners
Puerto Rican male long-distance runners
Olympic track and field athletes of Puerto Rico
Athletes (track and field) at the 1983 Pan American Games
Athletes (track and field) at the 1987 Pan American Games
Athletes (track and field) at the 1984 Summer Olympics
Athletes (track and field) at the 1992 Summer Olympics
Pan American Games gold medalists for Puerto Rico
Pan American Games bronze medalists for Puerto Rico
Pan American Games medalists in athletics (track and field)
Central American and Caribbean Games gold medalists for Puerto Rico
Competitors at the 1982 Central American and Caribbean Games
Competitors at the 1990 Central American and Caribbean Games
Central American and Caribbean Games medalists in athletics
Medalists at the 1983 Pan American Games
Medalists at the 1987 Pan American Games